The Pierre Werner Cricket Ground, also known as the Walferdange Cricket Ground, is a cricket ground in Walferdange, in central Luxembourg. It is the premier cricket venue in Luxembourg, being the home ground of the country's top club, the Optimists Cricket Club, which plays in the Belgian Cricket League, and of the Luxembourg national team.

The ground was opened in 1991. In 2002 the ground was given its present name to commemorate Pierre Werner (1913–2002), formerly Prime Minister of Luxembourg and honorary president of Optimists Cricket Club. The ground was established on land donated by the Walferdange commune, adjacent to the Alzette river.

The ground has hosted matches between the Luxembourg national team and various other teams, including the Belgium national team and the MCC. The heavy use of the ground is illustrated by the programme in 2003, when it "was in use almost every day between mid-April and early October". That year two internationals against France and one against Belgium were played on the ground (though one of the games against France was rained off). A six-a-side tournament was hosted in 2007.

The ground's pitch is artificial matting on concrete.

The ground hosts a one-week junior training academy each July. In 2010 this was attended by forty boys and girls of all ages, who were coached by a Level 3 coach from the UK and benefited from the ground's "excellent facilities". 

In August 2020, the ground was selected to host the 2020 Luxembourg T20I Trophy, a tri-series between Luxembourg, Belgium and the Czech Republic.

List of International Centuries

Twenty20 Internationals

This is the list of centuries scored at the ground in Twenty20 Internationals.

References

Walferdange
Cricket grounds in Luxembourg